Bojan Dimitrijević (born 4 November 1973) is a Serbian actor. He is best known for playing the role of a junkie nicknamed Pikac on the television series Vratiće se rode.

His other screen credits include movies such as: Jesen stiže dunjo moja (2004), Sivi kamion crvene boje (2004), Diši duboko (2004), Država mrtvih (2002), Boomerang (2001), and Nataša (2001).

His notable theatre roles include plays such as Trainspotting and Shopping and Fucking, both at Bitef Theatre.

He appears in the music video for Skunk Anansie's "My ugly boy" off their 2010 album Wonderlustre.

References

External links 
 
 My Ugly Boy Video on YouTube

Serbian male actors
People from Leskovac
1973 births
Living people